Calocucullia is a genus of moths of the family Noctuidae.

Species
 Calocucullia celsiae (Herrich-Schäffer, 1850)

References
 Calocucullia at Markku Savela's Lepidoptera and Some Other Life Forms
 Natural History Museum Lepidoptera genus database

Cuculliinae